Jon Leirfall (7 October 1899 – 12 June 1998) was a Norwegian politician for the Centre Party.

He was elected to the Norwegian Parliament from Nord-Trøndelag in 1945, and was re-elected on five occasions. He had previously been a deputy representative from 1937 to 1945.

Leirfall was born in Hegra and mayor of Hegra municipality in 1959–1961, and was thus its last mayor before its incorporation into Stjørdal municipality. Leirfall was then a member of Stjørdal municipality council in the periods 1961–1963 and 1963–1967.

Leirfall wrote several saga-pastiches, satirizing Norwegian politics, with his political friends and enemies thinly disguised as vikings and berserks.

References

1899 births
1998 deaths
Centre Party (Norway) politicians
Members of the Storting
Mayors of places in Nord-Trøndelag
People from Stjørdal
Place of death missing
Norwegian male writers
20th-century Norwegian politicians